Triphasia is a small genus of three species in the family Rutaceae, related to Citrus. The genus is native to southeastern Asia and New Guinea.

They are evergreen shrubs growing to 1–3 m tall, with trifoliate leaves. The flowers are fragrant, white, with three to five petals. The fruit is an edible red hesperidium similar to a small Citrus fruit.

Species
Triphasia brassii (C.T.White) Swingle – New Guinea
Triphasia grandifolia Merr. – Philippines
Triphasia trifolia (Burm.f.) P.Wils. – Malaysia

References

Aurantioideae
Aurantioideae genera